Zhvanets is a village (a selo) in Kamianets-Podilskyi Raion (district) of Khmelnytskyi Oblast in Western Ukraine. It hosts the administration of Zhvanets rural hromada, one of the hromadas of Ukraine. The village's population was 1,529 as of the 2001 Ukrainian census.

History 
Zhvanets was first mentioned in 1431, when the knight Svychko (or Svichka) received this settlement from King Władysław II Jagiełło. 

In the 15th century, the Zhvanetsky Castle was built, which was repeatedly rebuilt in the 16th and 17th centuries and was significantly destroyed during the 20th century. 

In 1620, the Turks and Tatars invaded Podillya having destroyed the fortress. The following year, 40,000 troops led by a Ukrainian Hetman of Zaporozhian Cossacks Petro Konashevych-Sahaidachny joined Zhvanets and took part in the Khotyn War. 

In 1646, King Władysław IV Vasa granted Zhvanets the Magdeburg rights. 

In the autumn of 1653, the troops of Jan II Casimir and Bohdan Khmelnytskyi met near the city during Khmelnytskyi Uprising resulting in the Battle of Zhvanets.

Notable people
Corinne Chochem (1905-1990), Jewish American choreographer, born in Zhvanets
Dov Karmi (1905–1962), architect in British Mandate Palestine and Israel, born in Zhvanets

See
 Battle of Zhvanets

External links 
 Zhvanets in the Encyclopedia of Ukraine, vol. 5 (1993)
 Zhvanets fortified settlement in the Encyclopedia of Ukraine, vol. 5 (1993)
 Zhvanets 
  Zhvanets village council

References

Kamianets-Podilskyi Raion
Villages in Kamianets-Podilskyi Raion